The discography of G-Unit, an American hip hop group, consists of two studio albums, two extended plays (EP), one soundtrack album, 43 mixtapes and 10 singles (including three as a featured artist). Music videos and collaborations are also included.

The group's members all grew up in South Jamaica, Queens, and when 50 Cent was spotted and signed to a label, both Lloyd Banks and Tony Yayo worked on mixtapes in order to gain attention as artists themselves. 50 Cent was later dropped from his label after being shot nine times in front of his grandmother's house, his label saw him as too much of a risk to keep. After being shot, 50 Cent signed to Interscope Records, who granted him his own record label later on due to the success of his debut album, Get Rich or Die Tryin'.
G-Unit continued to record and released several mixtape series which earned them attention in the rap industry, including 50 Cent Is the Future, God's Plan (album), No Mercy, No Fear and Automatic Gunfire.

Studio albums

EPs

Mixtapes

Singles

As lead artist

As featured artist

Other charted songs

Guest appearances

Music videos

See also
50 Cent discography
Lloyd Banks discography
Tony Yayo discography
Young Buck discography
Kidd Kidd

References

External links
 [ G-Unit discography] at Allmusic
 G-Unit at ASCAP
 G-Unit Radio mixtapes at Shadyville
 50 Cent War Angel LP

Discographies of American artists
Hip hop discographies